Jungle War Stories was a Dell Comics American comic book first published in 1962.  It was the first American war comic to cover the Vietnam War. Though the cover of the first issue read "The Jungles of Africa and Asia Have Become Flaming Battlegrounds," only Vietnam was covered.

Characters
The stories involved the adventures of three American Korean War veterans, pilot Captain Duke Larsen, Sergeant "Cactus" Kane of the U.S. Army Rangers (who wore an ARVN Ranger Beret), and "G.I." Mike Williams (who wore a bush hat) that trained and fought with the Vietnamese Rangers. Each issue featured a non fiction page about the war in Vietnam.

Transformation
Issue #12 in July 1965 changed its title to Guerilla War; the comic lasting until issue #14 in March 1966.  In January 1967 Dell began publishing Tales of the Green Beret that lasted five issues to 1969.

References

External links 
 Jungle War Stories on Comic Book Plus

War comics
1962 comics debuts
Dell Comics characters
Vietnam War and the media
Comics set during the Vietnam War